Pyotr Sergeevich Chernyshev (also written as Tchernyshev, ; 1914–1979) was a Chief Engineer of Leningradsky Metallichesky Zavod, a major pipe-construction specialist. Formerly a Soviet figure skater, four time national figure skating champion. Stalin Prize winner (1952) for the development of steam turbines of high pressure.

His grandson Peter Tchernyshev represented the U.S. in ice dancing.

Figure skating results

Honours and awards
 Hero of Socialist Labour - 1962
 Order of Lenin
 Order of the Red Banner of Labour
 Order of October Revolution
 Stalin Prize

References

1914 births
1979 deaths
People from Staroyuryevsky District
People from Kozlovsky Uyezd
Russian male single skaters
Soviet male single skaters
Soviet engineers
Sportspeople from Tambov Oblast
Stalin Prize winners
Heroes of Socialist Labour
Recipients of the Order of Lenin